The group stage of the 2014–15 Champions Hockey League was played from 21 August to 8 October 2014. A total of 44 teams competed in the group stage.

Draw
The eleven groups were determined by a draw, which took place on 21 May 2014 in Minsk, Belarus. The 44 teams were allocated into four seeding pots, consisting of 11 teams each with the highest ranked teams in pot 1 and the lowest ranked teams in pot 4, based on a special ranking criteria:
 Champions of the six founding leagues,
 Regular season winners of the six founding leagues,
 Remaining A- and B-license teams according to placing within their leagues,
 Wild card teams, according to placing within their leagues.

The teams were then drawn into eleven groups of four containing one team from each of the four seeding pots, with the restriction that teams from the same national association could not be drawn against each other.

The fixtures were decided after the draw was released on 2 June 2014.

Teams
Below are the 44 teams in the group stage, grouped by their seeding pot, based on their ranking. Where teams finished in the same place in their respective leagues, they were ranked according to the IIHF World Ranking of the leagues.

Format
The 44 teams were divided into eleven groups of four teams each. In each group, teams play against each other home-and-away in a round-robin format, giving six games per team. In total, 132 games were played in the group stage. The 11 group winners and the five best ranked runners-up qualified for the playoffs. The five best runners-up were determined by ranking all runners-up based on their number of points and goal differential in their respective groups, explained more detailed in section ranking of second-placed teams.

The matches are played in 60 minutes (3 periods with 20 minutes each) with the winning team receiving three points (the losing teams gets zero points). If a match ended with a draw both teams received one point and the game proceeded to a five-minute overtime (with teams playing with four players instead of regular five) to determine a winner of a bonuspoint. The first team to score in overtime wins the match and the bonuspoint. If the overtime ends scoreless a shootout is used to determine the winner (and who gets bonuspoint). The teams take five penalties each and the teams who scored most penalties take the win, and if the shootout is also a draw extra penalties are used to determine the winners.

Tiebreakers
The teams are ranked according to points (3 points for a win in regular time, 2 points for a win in overtime or shootout, 1 point for an initial tie and loss in overtime or shootout, 0 points for a loss in regular time). If two or more teams are equal on points on completion of the group matches, the following criteria are applied to determine the rankings:
Most points in games against other tied teams;
Best goal difference in games against other tied teams;
Most goals scored in games against other tied teams;

Once a team is separated from the group of tied teams, the remaining teams will return to criteria 1.

If two teams still remain tied and their two mutual games were decided in overtime or a penalty shootout, an overtime victory will be considered greater than a shootout victory. If both games were decided in shootouts, then the team that scored the most total goals in the two shootouts will be ranked ahead. Note that this criteria would only apply if only two teams remain tied.

If a tie still remains between two or more teams, the teams will be ranked in order of their finish in their most recent national championship (champion, runner-up, two remaining semi-finalists ranked by regular-season standings, four remaining quarter-finalists ranked by regular-season standings). If they finished in the same position in their respective leagues, the CHL Club Ranking will be used, which is same ranking used when seeding the clubs ahead of the group stage.

Groups
The group stage began on 21 August 2014 and ended on 8 October 2014. The matchdays were 21–22 August, 23–24 August, 4–5 September, 6–7 September, 23–24 September and 7–8 October 2014. All matchtimes are local times.

Group A

Group B

Group C

Group D

Group E

Group F

Group G

Group H

Group I

Group J

Group K

Ranking of second-placed teams
The five best runners-ups from the group stage were determined by the following parameters in this order:
 Points
 Goal difference
 Goals scored
 Final position in last year's national championship
 CHL Club Ranking (same as used in group stage seeding)

References

Group